The Shrine of St. Thérèse of the Child Jesus is a Roman Catholic church located in Pasay, Philippines, across the main entrance of Ninoy Aquino International Airport Terminal 3.  Dedicated to Saint Thérèse de Lisieux, the church is classified as a diocesan shrine governed by the Military Ordinariate of the Philippines.

History
The Shrine began in 1947 as a makeshift chapel in Nichols Air Base (now Villamor Air Base) constructed by Rev José Alberto, the first military chaplain assigned to the Philippine Air Force. Originally dedicated to Michael the Archangel, it was expanded several times to meet the spiritual needs of the increasing numbers of Philippine Air Force servicemen. After undergoing major renovations in the 1980s, it was consecrated on 16 December 1983 and dedicated to Saint Thérèse of the Child Jesus by Archbishop Bruno Torpigliani, then-Apostolic Nuncio to the Philippines.

The Shrine was spared destruction during privatisation of some parts of Villamor Air Base under President Joseph Estrada, in a memorandum signed on 10 April 2000, and by the deed of usufruct granted to the Military Ordinariate of the Philippines by the Bases Conversion and Development Authority on 9 November 2000 during the chairmanship of Rogelio L. Singson. After the visit of the pilgrim relics of St Thérèse in 2000, the Shrine again underwent a major reconstruction initiated by the reigning Ordinary, Archbishop Ramon C. Arguelles, to promote the saint's spirituality and to encourage devotion to the "Millennium Saint" amongst servicemen. From 8 March 2005, this project continued towards its completion under a new Ordinary, Most Rev Leopoldo S. Tumulak.

On 6 January 2007, Archbishop of Manila Gaudencio Cardinal Rosales approved the request of Bishop Tumulak to hold liturgical services for the Military Ordinariate in the Shrine, which was collocated within the territory of the Archdiocese of Manila. The newly refurbished Shrine was consecrated and rededicated  to St Thérèse on 17 May 2007. The presider at the consecration service was Archbishop of Cebu Ricardo Cardinal Vidal, while among the other co-celebrating bishops was Catholic Bishops' Conference of the Philippines President, Archbishop Ángel Lagdameo. Also on that day-the 82nd anniversary of the canonisation of St. Thérèse–the church was declared a Diocesan Shrine of the Ordinariate by Bishop Tumulak. Present at the service were President Gloria Macapagal Arroyo, who unveiled the historical marker; high officials of the Department of National Defense; and the top brass of the Armed Forces, Police and other uniformed services under the canonical jurisdiction of the Military Ordinariate.

Gallery

References

External links

 Therese relics returns to PH 
 Thousands flock to greet St Therese's relics

Roman Catholic churches in Metro Manila
Department of National Defense (Philippines)
 
Catholic pilgrimage sites
Roman Catholic shrines in the Philippines
Buildings and structures in Pasay